Mark Richard Zubro is an American mystery novelist. He lives in Mokena, Illinois and taught 8th grade English at Summit Hill Jr. High in nearby Frankfort Square, Illinois.

Zubro writes bestselling mysteries set in Chicago and the surrounding Cook County area, which are widely praised as fast-paced, with interesting plots and well-rounded, likeable characters.  His novels feature gay themes, and Zubro is himself gay.

His longest running series features high school teacher Tom Mason, and Tom's boyfriend, professional baseball player Scott Carpenter. The other series Zubro is known for is the Paul Turner mysteries, which are about a Chicago police detective. The books are a part of the Stonewall Inn Mystery series, published by St. Martin's Press. Zubro won a Lambda Literary Award for Gay Mystery for his book A Simple Suburban Murder.

Books

Tom and Scott mysteries
A Simple Suburban Murder (1990)
Why Isn't Becky Twitchell Dead? (1991)
The Only Good Priest (1991)
The Principal Cause of Death (1992)
An Echo of Death (1995)
Rust on the Razor (1996)
Are You Nuts? (1999)
One Dead Drag Queen (2001)
Here Comes the Corpse (2002)
File Under Dead (2004)
Everyone's Dead But Us (2006)
Schooled in Murder (2008)
Another Dead Republican (2012)
A Conspiracy of Fear (2014)

Paul Turner mysteries
Sorry Now? (1991)
Political Poison (1994)
Another Dead Teenager (1996)
The Truth Can Get You Killed (1998)
Drop Dead (1999)
Sex and Murder.com (2002)
Dead Egotistical Morons (2003)
Nerds Who Kill (2005)
Hook, Line, and Homicide (2007)
Black and Blue and Pretty Dead Too (2011)
Pawn of Satan (2013)

Roger and Steve young adult mysteries
Fear (2014)
Hope (2015)
Always (2018)

Alien Danger gay science fiction trilogy
Alien Quest (2013)
Alien Home (2014)
Alien Victory (2015)

References

External links
 Official website

American mystery writers
Novelists from Illinois
American gay writers
Living people
People from Mokena, Illinois
Lambda Literary Award winners
1948 births
American LGBT novelists
American male novelists
Schoolteachers from Illinois
20th-century American educators
20th-century American novelists
20th-century American male writers
21st-century American novelists
21st-century American male writers